The 2010 congressional elections in Nebraska were held on November 2, 2010 to determine who will represent the state of Nebraska in the United States House of Representatives. Representatives are elected for two-year terms; those elected served in the 112th Congress from January 3, 2011 until January 3, 2013.

Nebraska has three seats in the House, apportioned according to the 2000 United States Census. Its 2008-2009 congressional delegation consisted of three Republicans: Jeff Fortenberry in District 1, Lee Terry in District 2 and Adrian Smith in District 3. All three ran for reelection.

Overview

By district
Results of the 2010 United States House of Representatives elections in Nebraska by district:

District 1 

In this solidly conservative district based in eastern Nebraska, including some Omaha suburbs and the city of Lincoln, incumbent Republican Congressman Jeff Fortenberry ran for a fourth term. Congressman Fortenberry was opposed by Democrat Ivy Harper, a journalist and a legislative assistant to former Congressman John Cavanaugh. Harper did not stand much chance in this district, and Fortenberry was overwhelmingly re-elected.

Results

District 2 

This conservative-leaning district is solely based in metropolitan Omaha and has been represented by incumbent Republican Congressman Lee Terry since he was first elected in 1998. Congressman Terry faced a tough bid for re-election in 2008 from Democrat Jim Esch, but Esch declined to run for Congress a third time in 2010. Instead, State Senator Tom White emerged as the Democratic nominee. Though polls indicated the race to be close and Democrats saw the 2nd district as one of their few pick-up opportunities, Congressman Terry was ultimately re-elected by a wide margin on election day.

Polling

Results

District 3 
 

This congressional district, which constitutes nearly 85% of Nebraska's land mass, is one of the most conservative districts in the country. Though incumbent Congressman Adrian Smith, a Republican, was elected to his first term in 2006 by a shockingly small ten-point margin of victory, he has enjoyed considerable luck since. This year, Congressman Smith faced Democratic nominee Rebekah Davis and independent candidate Dan Hill. As expected, Smith trounced both Davis and Hill to win a third term to Congress.

Results

References

External links
Elections at the Nebraska Secretary of State
U.S. Congress candidates for Nebraska at Project Vote Smart
Nebraska U.S. House from OurCampaigns.com
Campaign contributions for U.S. Congressional races in Nebraska from OpenSecrets
2010 Nebraska General Election graph of multiple polls from Pollster.com

House - Nebraska from the Cook Political Report

United States Senate